Ramón López Carrozas, O.de M. (31 August 1937 – 28 April 2018) was a Brazilian-Spanish Roman Catholic bishop.

Carrozas was born in Spain and was ordained to the priesthood in 1960. He served as titular bishop of Ceramus and auxiliary bishop of the Roman Catholic Diocese of Bom Jesus do Gurguéia, Brazil, from 1979 to 1989. Carrozas then served as bishop of the Diocese from 1989 to 2014.

Notes

1937 births
2018 deaths
Mercedarian bishops
21st-century Roman Catholic bishops in Brazil
Spanish Roman Catholic bishops in South America
Roman Catholic bishops of Bom Jesus do Gurguéia